José Antonio Meade Kuribreña (born 27 February 1969) is a Mexican politician, economist, lawyer, and diplomat. He served as a cabinet minister under Presidents Felipe Calderón and Enrique Peña Nieto in a variety of portfolios, becoming the first Mexican official appointed to cabinet five times. He was the Institutional Revolutionary Party (PRI) candidate in the 2018 presidential election, where he placed third.

Biography
Meade is the son of Dionisio Meade and his wife Lucía, daughter of the lawyer and sculptor José Kuribreña. The Meade Kuribreña family is a Mexican family of Irish and Lebanese descent. He is married to painter Juana Cuevas and they have 3 children.

Education 
Meade has a B.S. in Economics from Instituto Tecnológico Autónomo de México (ITAM), a B.S. in Law from Universidad Nacional Autónoma de México (UNAM) and a Ph.D. in Economics from Yale University.

Career 
From 1997 to 1999, Meade was the General Director of Financial Planning at the National Commission for the Retirement Savings System. In 1999, he was named Deputy Secretary of Bank Savings Protection at Mexico's Institute for the Protection of Bank Savings. The following year, he became General Director of Banking and Savings at the Ministry of Finance and Public Credit. As Chief Executive Officer of the National Bank for Rural Credit (2002 to 2003), he led the financial restructuring and transition to the new institution that would substitute Banrural: Financiera Rural, where he would serve as Chief Executive Office until 2006.

Felipe Calderón's Administration 
During President Felipe Calderón's administration, Meade served as Chief of Staff to the Secretary of Finance and Public Credit, Undersecretary of Finance and Public Credit, and later on he became a member of the Cabinet, serving as Secretary of Energy, and Secretary of Finance and Public Credit.

Secretary of Energy (2011) 
As Secretary of Energy, Meade implemented the first bidding round for Integrated Exploration and Production Contracts and new ducts that allowed natural gas to reach multiple communities for the first time. Furthermore, he brought electricity to all communities of over 100 inhabitants, promoted a more efficient use of energy and distributed around 50 million energy saving light bulbs.

Secretary of Finance and Public Credit (2011 - 2012) 
The first time Meade served as Secretary of Finance and Public Credit, he led the Ministry throughout Mexico's presidency of the G20, achieving agreements to strengthen the IMF, reduce protectionism and position financial inclusion as a priority. Moreover, he conducted a smooth transition between administrations from different parties with robust growth and stable inflation.

Enrique Peña Nieto's Administration

Secretary of Foreign Affairs (2012 - 2015) 

The first position he held in President Enrique Peña Nieto's administration was as Secretary of Foreign Affairs, where he broadened the relation with the United States, by creating a framework beyond migration and security, which promoted research, innovation, entrepreneurship and higher education, through the US-Mexico Bilateral Forum on Higher Education, Innovation and Research, and the Mexico-US Entrepreneurship and Innovation Council. Moreover, he improved the access of undocumented migrants in the US to health and education, as well as to key documents such as driving licenses, birth certificates and identification cards. Finally, he normalized diplomatic relations with Cuba and France. In 2013, Foreign Policy named him one of the world's most powerful people.

Secretary of Social Development (2015 - 2016) 
As Secretary of Social Development, Meade designed and implemented the National Inclusion Strategy to ensure access by Mexico's poorest to the social services they were legally entitled to have. During his tenure, 2 million people left the ranks of extreme poverty, through the involvement of local governments, businessmen, and civil society. In February 2016, the League of United Latin American Citizens Council No. 12 in Laredo, Texas, U.S., announced that Meade and George P. Bush, the Texas land commissioner, would both receive the titles of "Señor Internacional," a designation used since 1976 to honor distinguished figures in the border region as part of the annual Washington's Birthday Celebration.

Secretary of Finance and Public Credit (2016 - 2017) 

During his second time as Secretary of Finance and Public Credit, two of the world's top rating agencies changed their rating perspective of Mexico from negative to stable, and in 2017 Mexico's economy grew 50% more than expected. Furthermore, he achieved the first primary surplus in 9 years and reduced the debt-to-GDP ratio, for the first time in 10 years. In 2017, he was named Latin America's Finance Minister of the Year by Capital Markets magazine.

2018 Presidential Campaign 

On 9 August 2017, the PRI revised its requirements for presidential candidates, eliminating the requirement that candidates must have 10 years of party membership, and allowing "illustrious" non-party figures to lead the party. This move was seen as benefitting Meade, as he is not a member of the PRI. On 27 November 2017, Meade resigned his post as Secretary of Finance and Public Credit and announced he would compete in the 2018 presidential election, representing the Institutional Revolutionary Party (PRI). Meade was seen as the safest bet for the party, as his formal non-affiliation and clean public record could distance him from the party's scandals. Meade was formally selected as the PRI's candidate at their convention of delegates on 18 February 2018.

On Election Day, shortly after the polls closed, Meade conceded defeat and wished victor Andrés Manuel López Obrador "every success".

Other activities
He currently serves as non-executive Director of Grupo ALFA, Grupo Comercial Chedraui and he is the first Latin-American to be an Independent non executive Director of HSBC Holdings. Furthermore, he is a board member of the Global Center on Adaptation and the Center for US-Mexico Studies at UC San Diego.

Honors
 Honorary Knight Commander of the Order of St Michael and St George (2015)

References

External links

 Official Site

|-

|-

|-

|-

Mexican diplomats
Mexican economists
20th-century Mexican lawyers
Mexican people of Lebanese descent
Mexican people of Irish descent
Mexican Secretaries of Energy
Mexican Secretaries of Finance
Mexican Secretaries of Foreign Affairs
Mexican Secretaries of Social Development
Politicians from Mexico City
Candidates in the 2018 Mexican presidential election
Honorary Knights Commander of the Order of St Michael and St George
Instituto Tecnológico Autónomo de México alumni
1969 births
Living people
People with vitiligo
National Autonomous University of Mexico alumni
Yale University alumni
21st-century Mexican politicians